Rui Manuel Muati Modesto (born 7 October 1999) is a Portuguese footballer who plays as a right winger for AIK.

He was born in Vendas Novas and spent his youth career in Afeiteira, Estrela Vendas Novas, Juventude Évora, Lusitano Évora and Vitória Setubal U23.

Career statistics

Club

Honours
Individual
Veikkausliiga Team of the Year: 2022

References

1999 births
Living people
Portuguese footballers
Portuguese expatriate footballers
Association football defenders
Campeonato de Portugal (league) players
Kakkonen players
Veikkausliiga players
FC Honka players
Portuguese expatriate sportspeople in Finland
Expatriate footballers in Finland